Usman Khan (born 10 May 1995) is a Pakistani cricketer.

Personal life
Due to the lack of cricketing opportunities in Pakistan for some time he had to get out of the country for a job, ultimately moving to Ajman in the United Arab Emirates where he worked in the purchasing department of a gas distribution company.

Domestic & franchise cricket
He made his first-class debut for Karachi Whites in the 2017–18 Quaid-e-Azam Trophy on 9 October 2017. He made his Twenty20 debut on 3 March 2021, for Quetta Gladiators in the 2021 Pakistan Super League. 

In November 2022, Usman was signed by the Chattogram Challengers to play for them in the 2022–23 Bangladesh Premier League. On 9 January 2023, he hit his maiden century in T20 cricket, scoring 103 runs off just 58 balls against the Khulna Tigers, guiding his team to the first win of the tournament by 9 wickets.
on 11 March 2023, he recorded a century off just 36 delivery in Pakistan super league which is the fastest by a batter in the league.

References

External links
 

1995 births
Living people
Pakistani cricketers
Place of birth missing (living people)
Karachi Whites cricketers
Quetta Gladiators cricketers